Leninskaya Iskra , rural localities in Russia, may refer to:

 Leninskaya Iskra, Kirov Oblast, a settlement
 Leninskaya Iskra, Kursk Oblast, a selo
 Leninskaya Iskra, Nizhny Novgorod Oblast, a settlement

See also
 Leninskaya Line
 Leninskaya Sloboda